{{Infobox film
| name        = The Weather Underground
| image       = Theweatherunderground.jpg
| caption     = U.S. DVD cover
| writer      = 
| starring    = Bill AyersBernardine DohrnMark RuddBrian FlanaganNaomi JaffeLaura WhitehornDavid GilbertKathleen Neal CleaverTodd Gitlin
| director    = Sam GreenBill Siegel
| producer    = 
| music       = 
| distributor = 
| released    = 
| runtime     = 95 minutes
| country     = United States
| language    = English
| budget      = 
| gross       = $564,632<ref>The Weather Underground Box Office Mojo</ref>
}}The Weather Underground is a 2002 documentary film based on the rise and fall of the American radical far-left Communist terrorist organization Weather Underground.

Summary
Using archive footage from the time as well as interviews with the Weathermen in the modern day, the film constructs a linear narrative of the organization and serves as a cautionary tale.

Reception
Critical responseThe Weather Underground has an approval rating of 91% on review aggregator website Rotten Tomatoes, based on 58 reviews, and an average rating of 7.79/10. The website's critical consensus states, "Fascinating documentary about the militant Weathermen".  Metacritic assigned the film a weighted average score of 77 out of 100, based on 23 critics, indicating "generally favorable reviews".

Accolades
The film, directed by Sam Green and Bill Siegel, won the audience choice award at the Chicago Underground Film Festival and went on to be nominated for the Academy Award for Best Documentary Feature in 2004.

See alsoUndergroundThe Company You KeepAmerican Pastoral, the 2016 film adaptation of Philip Roth's novel about American left-wing terrorism

References

External links
The Weather Underground site for Independent Lens'' on PBS

The Weather Underground on Sam Green's website
The Weather Underground Official Site
The Weather Underground on Vimeo

2002 documentary films
2002 films
American documentary films
Documentary films about American politics
Weather Underground
Documentary films about revolutionaries
Films directed by Sam Green
2000s English-language films
2000s American films

fr:The Weather Underground
Documentary films about terrorism